German submarine U-119 was a Type XB minelaying U-boat of Nazi Germany's Kriegsmarine during World War II.
She was laid down at the Germaniawerft in Kiel on 15 May 1940 as yard number 624. She was launched on 6 January 1942 and commissioned under Kapitänleutnant Alois Zech on 2 April 1942, he was replaced by Kptlt. Horst-Tessen von Kameke on 15 April 1943, who remained in command until her loss.

U-119s service career began with the 4th U-boat Flotilla on 2 April 1942 where she underwent training. She was declared operational on 1 February 1943 when she moved over to the 12th flotilla.

Operational career
The boat made a short run from Kiel to Frederikshaven in Denmark and back from 4 to 10 August 1942.

First patrol
Her first patrol commenced with her departure from Kiel on 6 February 1943. She crossed the North Sea and skirted the northern coast of Iceland, arriving at Bordeaux in occupied France on 1 April.

Second patrol and loss
U-119 was unsuccessfully attacked on 29 April 1943 by a Short Sunderland flying boat of 461 Squadron RAAF (Royal Australian Air Force). The boat sustained no damage but one man was killed.

She sank Halma on 3 June east of Halifax, Nova Scotia and damaged John A. Poor on 27 July. Both ships were attacked with mines laid by U-119 on 1 June.

Summary of raiding history

References

Bibliography

External links

German Type X submarines
U-boats commissioned in 1942
U-boats sunk in 1943
World War II submarines of Germany
World War II shipwrecks in the Atlantic Ocean
U-boats sunk by British warships
U-boats sunk by depth charges
1942 ships
Ships built in Kiel
Maritime incidents in June 1943